Dalefield is a rural community in the Carterton District and Wellington Region of New Zealand's North Island.

It was the location of the Dalefield railway station on the Wairarapa Line between 1880 and 1981.

KiwiRail has identified the Watersons Line crossing in Dalefield as one of the most dangerous railway crossings in Wairarapa.

In May 2018, plans were drawn up to develop a solar plant on a former landfill site in Dalefield.

Dalefield also has a lavender farm.

Parts of the area were affected by severe weather during November and December 2018, which caused widespread flooding but prevented a drought.

Demographics
Wainuioru is part of the Mount Holdsworth statistical area.

Education

The school established a low-power radio station in 2019.

References 

Populated places in the Wellington Region
Wairarapa
Carterton District
Carterton, New Zealand